Pete Sampras defeated MaliVai Washington in the final, 6–3, 6–2  to win the men's singles tennis title at the 1993 Miami Open.

Michael Chang was the defending champion, but lost in the second round to Marcos Ondruska.

Seeds
All seeds receive a bye into the second round.

Draw

Finals

Top half

Section 1

Section 2

Section 3

Section 4

Bottom half

Section 5

Section 6

Section 7

Section 8

Qualifying

Qualifying seeds

Qualifiers

Lucky loser
  Javier Frana

Qualifying draws

First qualifier

Second qualifier

Third qualifier

Fourth qualifier

Fifth qualifier

Sixth qualifier

Seventh qualifier

Eighth qualifier

Ninth qualifier

Tenth qualifier

Eleventh qualifier

Twelfth qualifier

References

External links
 Official results archive (ATP)
 Official results archive (ITF)

Men's Singles